first opened in Tenri, Nara Prefecture, Japan, in 1930. The Museum reopened in a new building in 2001. The collection of over 280,000 objects includes ethnographic and archaeological material from Japan and the rest of the world, as well as transport-related artefacts.

References

External links
  Tenri University Sankōkan Museum 
  Tenri University Sankōkan Museum

Museums in Nara Prefecture
University museums in Japan
Tenri, Nara
Museums established in 1930
1930 establishments in Japan